Ma Shi Chau Special Area is a Special Area of Hong Kong. It is located in Tai Po District and in Tolo Harbour, in the northeast of the New Territories. 

It was designated in 1999 and covers 61 hectares.

This area is considered a geological wonder, there are rocks over 280 million years old from the Permian period.

See also
 Conservation in Hong Kong

References

External links

 Ma Shi Chau - Travel Blog
 Permian rock garden of Hong Kong － Ma Shi Chau Special Area
 Ma Shi Chau Special Area 
 Ma Shi Chau Special Area – Outdoor Geological Museum
 Ma Shi Chau Nature Trail

Country parks and special areas of Hong Kong
Tai Po District